Notobrachyops is a genus of brachyopid temnospondyl amphibian. It is known from a skull roof impression found in the Ashfield Shale (Late Triassic) of Mortdale, New South Wales, Australia. The Ashfield Shale has also yielded a shark species, a lungfish species, six species of paleoniscid fish, a species of holostean fish, a subholostean fish, and the labyrinthodont amphibian Paracyclotosaurus davidi.

See also
 List of prehistoric amphibians
 Prehistoric amphibian

References

Stereospondyls
Triassic amphibians of South America
Fossil taxa described in 1973